This is a list of moths of the family Brahmaeidae that are found in India. It also acts as an index to the species articles and forms part of the full List of moths of India.

Genus Brahmaea

 Brahmaea wallichii (Gray, 1831)

Genus Brahmidia

 Brahmidia hearseyi (White, 1862) Listed in Hampson (Fauna of British India: Moths vol.1) as Brahmaea hearseyi

See also
Brahmaeidae
Moths
Lepidoptera
List of moths of India

Cited references

References
 Hampson, G.F. et al. (1892-1937) Fauna of British India, Including Ceylon and Burma: Moths. Vols. 1-5 cxix + 2813 p - 1295 figs - 1 table - 15 pl (12 in col.)

 

M